San Demetrio may refer to:

 San Demetrio Corone, town and municipality in the Calabria region of Italy
 San Demetrio ne' Vestini, commune and town in the Province of L'Aquila in the Abruzzo region of Italy
 San Demetrio London, a 1943 British World War II docudrama
 , British motor tanker

See also

 Demetrio (disambiguation)